Eugene Edward Siler Sr. (June 26, 1900 – December 5, 1987) was an American politician and member of the United States House of Representatives from Kentucky between 1955 and 1965. He was the only member of the House of Representatives to oppose (by pairing against) the Gulf of Tonkin Resolution. That resolution authorized deeper involvement of the United States in the Vietnam War.

Life and career
Siler, a self-described "Kentucky hillbilly", was born in Williamsburg, Kentucky, the son of attorney Adam Troy and Minnie (née Chandler) Siler. He was a staunch Republican and hailed from a traditionally Republican region of Kentucky. Siler served in the United States Navy during World War I and in the United States Army as a captain during World War II. His war-time experiences left him, according to David T. Beito, "cold to most proposals to send American troops into harm's way."

Siler graduated from Cumberland College in Williamsburg in 1920 and from the University of Kentucky at Lexington in 1922.  He attended law school at Columbia University and returned to Williamsburg to be a small-town lawyer. Siler was a devout Baptist and became a renowned preacher. He abstained from alcohol, tobacco, and profanity; and, as a lawyer, rejected clients seeking divorces or who were accused of alcohol-related crimes.

In 1945, Siler was elected a judge of the Court of Appeals of Kentucky. He refused his 150-dollar expense allotment, instead donating it to a special fund Siler set up for scholarships. As a judge, Siler frequently quoted scriptures from the bench. He did the same in his speeches during his 1951 run for governor. This, according to Beito, earned him "a statewide reputation as a 'Bible Crusader. Siler was the Republican nominee for Governor of Kentucky in 1951. He was defeated by Democrat Lawrence Wetherby, who won   346,345 votes (54.6%) to Siler's 288,014 (45.4%).

During his tenure in the House of Representatives, which began in 1955, Siler consistently stressed social conservatism. He sponsored a bill to ban liquor and beer advertising in all interstate media. He stated that permitting these ads was akin to allowing the "harsh hussy" to advertise in "the open door of her place of business for the allurement of our school children". Additionally, he was "100 percent for Bible reading and the Lord's Prayer in our public schools".

Like his friend and fellow Republican, Representative Harold Royce Gross, Siler considered himself a fiscal watchdog. He opposed junkets, government debt, and high spending. Siler made exceptions for his home district, however, by supporting flood control and other federal measures that aided his district.

Like Gross, Siler was a Taft Republican (or Old Right Republican) who was opposed to entangling military alliances and foreign interventions. Siler was a consistent opponent of foreign aid; he was one of only two congressmen to vote against John F. Kennedy's call up of reserves during the Berlin crisis. He supported Barry Goldwater in 1964 but did not share his interventionist foreign policy views. This non-interventionism did not seem to bother his constituents.

Siler did not sign the 1956 Southern Manifesto, and voted in favor of the Civil Rights Acts of 1957 and 1960, as well as the 24th Amendment to the U.S. Constitution, but did not vote on the Civil Rights Act of 1964.

Siler was critical of U.S. involvement in Vietnam. In 1964, after deciding not to seek reelection, he quipped, in jest, that he would run for President as an antiwar candidate—he pledged to resign after one day in office after ordering the troops brought home. He considered the Gulf of Tonkin Resolution, which authorized President Johnson to take "all necessary steps" in Vietnam, as a "buck-passing" pretext to "seal the lips of Congress against future criticism."

In 1968, the worsening situation in Vietnam prompted Siler to return to politics, unsuccessfully seeking the Republican U.S. Senate nomination. Siler ran on a platform calling for withdrawal of all U.S. troops by Christmas. Ernest Gruening (D.-Alaska) and Wayne Morse (D.-Oreg.), the only two U.S. Senators who voted against the Gulf of Tonkin Resolution, were also defeated that year.

Siler married Lowell Jones in 1925 at Williamsburg, and they had four children, one of whom, Eugene Edward Siler Jr., became a federal judge. He died at his daughter's Louisville home on December 5, 1987.

Legacy
 In 1985, Cumberland College, in Siler's hometown of Williamsburg, built a men's residence hall named Eugene Siler Hall.

See also

References

 "The Christian Conservative Who Opposed the Vietnam War" History News Network, August 21, 2006, by David T. Beito and Linda Royster Beito
 U.S. Congress profile

1900 births
1987 deaths
20th-century American judges
20th-century American lawyers
20th-century American politicians
United States Army personnel of World War II
United States Navy personnel of World War I
American people of the Vietnam War
Baptists from Kentucky
Judges of the Kentucky Court of Appeals
Kentucky lawyers
Non-interventionism
Old Right (United States)
People from Whitley County, Kentucky
Republican Party members of the United States House of Representatives from Kentucky
United States Army officers
United States Navy sailors
Columbia Law School alumni
University of Kentucky alumni